The year 1775 in science and technology involved some significant events.

Biology
 The cheetah (Acinonyx jubatus) is described.

Chemistry
 May 25 – Joseph Priestley's account of his isolation of oxygen in the form of a gas ("dephlogisticated air") is read to the Royal Society of London.
 Torbern Bergman's  ("A Dissertation on Elective Attractions") is published, containing the largest tables of chemical affinity ever published.

Exploration
 July 30 – 3-year second voyage of James Cook completed, the first eastabout global circumnavigation, during which the Antarctic Circle has been crossed three times, Terra Australis shown to be a myth, and Larcum Kendall's K1 chronometer demonstrated to be a reliable timekeeper for the purpose of calculating longitude.

Mathematics
 Lagrange's Recherches d'Arithmétique develops a general theory of binary quadratic forms.

Medicine
 English surgeon Percivall Pott finds the first occupational link to cancer, contributing to the science of epidemiology.
 German physician Melchior Adam Weikard anonymously publishes the textbook Der Philosophische Arzt including the earliest description of symptoms resembling attention deficit hyperactivity disorder.

Natural history
 February 21 – La Specola, Florence's Museum of Zoology and Natural History, opens to the public.
 Johan Christian Fabricius publishes his .

Technology
 James Watt's 1769 steam engine patent is extended to June 1800 by Act of Parliament of Great Britain and the first engines are built under it.
 Jacques-Constantin Périer operates a paddle steamer on the Seine, but it proves to be underpowered.
 Alexander Cumming patents the S-trap in London, laying the foundations for the modern flush toilet.
 Edinburgh confectioner Charles Spalding devises improvements to the diving bell, adding a system of balance-weights.
 Pierre-Simon Girard, age 74, invents a water turbine.
 December 30 – John Arnold takes out his first patent for improvements in the construction of marine chronometers in Britain, including the first for a compensation balance.
 Approximate date – Thomas Mudge invents the detached lever escapement for clocks and watches.

Awards
 Copley Medal: Nevil Maskelyne

Births
 January 22 – André-Marie Ampère, French physicist (died 1836)
 February 9 – Farkas Bolyai, Hungarian mathematician (died 1856)
 May 10 – William Phillips, English geologist (died 1828)
 July 23 – Étienne-Louis Malus, French physicist and mathematician] (died 1812)
 September 30 – Robert Adrain, Irish-born mathematician (died 1843)
 November 19 – Johann Karl Wilhelm Illiger, German entomologist and zoologist (died 1813)

Deaths
 March 3 – Richard Dunthorne, English astronomer (born 1711)
 May 1 – Israel Lyons, English mathematician and botanist (born 1739; died of measles)
 October 25 – Johan Maurits Mohr, Dutch astronomer (born 1716)

References

 
18th century in science
1770s in science